Parker Unified School District is a school district in La Paz County, Arizona.

References

External links
 

School districts in Arizona